Penny Schwinn is an American educator and current Commissioner of Education for the U.S. state of Tennessee. She was appointed by Governor Bill Lee on January 17, 2019, and was sworn in on February 1, 2019.

Early life and education 
Schwinn was born and raised in Sacramento, California. Her mother was an educator for low-income students in Sacramento for nearly 40 years. Many of her extended family are also educators. After graduating high school, she went on to receive her Bachelor of Arts from the University of California, Berkeley, then Master of Arts in Teaching from Johns Hopkins University, and her PhD in Education Policy from Claremont Graduate University.

Career 
Schwinn began her career in education as a high school history and economics teacher in Baltimore, Maryland. She also has been involved in education in South Los Angeles and has worked in the private sector. She then served on the board of education for Sacramento County, California. After being a principal and board member, she served as the Assistant Secretary of Education of Delaware. She later served as the Deputy Commissioner of Standards and Engagement, Deputy Commissioner of Special Populations and Monitoring, and Chief Deputy Commissioner of Academics at the Texas Education Agency. In 2019, she left the agency, after being appointed by Governor Bill Lee to become the next Commissioner of the Tennessee Department of Education. She was sworn in on February 1, 2019.

Personal life 
Schwinn is married to Paul Schwinn, who is also an educator and has worked with multiple educational institutions and advocacy groups. She has three children, two of whom are students in Tennessee public schools.

References 

Living people
Educators from Tennessee
State constitutional officers of Tennessee
UC Berkeley College of Letters and Science alumni
Johns Hopkins University alumni
Claremont Graduate University alumni
1982 births